The Central Governorate was one of the five governorates of Bahrain until September 2014. It included parts of the former municipalities of  Jid Ali, Madinat 'Isa, Sitrah and A'ali.

References

Governorates of Bahrain